Michał Szpak (born 26 November 1990) is a Polish singer who found fame on the inaugural season of the Polish X Factor in 2011. On 12 May 2016, Szpak represented Poland at the Eurovision Song Contest 2016 in Stockholm, Sweden with the song "Color of Your Life".

Early life
Michał was born in Jasło, a small town in southern Poland. His older sister Marlena is an Opera singer born from his father Andrzej Szpak's first marriage. After the split, father Szpak got married for the second time, from this relationship was born Damian, Michał, and Ewa. The couple split when Michał was 10. Because of this and a job offer, his mother moved to Italy. The Szpak children kept living in Poland with dad, and used to visit mom during holidays. Brother Damian became one of the greatest support for the young Michał due to his excentricity. His early music influences included Queen, Muse, Zbigniew Preisner, David Bowie and Michael Jackson. As a high school student together with his friend, Kamil Czapla, Szpak was part of the Whiplash band playing mostly hard rock style music. Over the years, he has admitted that unlike his older sister, he has never taken any formal music lessons. Szpak currently resides in Warsaw, where he is pursuing a psychology degree at the University of Social Sciences and Humanities.

Career

2011–2014: Career beginnings and X Factor

On March 6, 2011, Szpak took part in Poland's first edition of The X Factor when he sang Czesław Niemen's classic "Dziwny jest ten świat" (Strange is the world). He eventually reached the final of the competition. On 5 June 2011, Szpak and 2008 British winner Alexandra Burke sang "Hallelujah" during the final. On June 17, 2011 he was part of the lineup for the Orange Warsaw Festival at Stadion Legii, which also included international artists such as Moby, Skunk Anansie, My Chemical Romance, Sistars, Plan B, The Streets and Jamiroquai.

Between September 4 and November 6 of 2011, Szpak participated in the 13th edition of Taniec z gwiazdami, the Polish version of Dancing with the Stars, where he was partnered with the Polish professional dancer Paulina Biernat. Together they reached 5th place in the competition. Szpak's debut EP, XI, was released by Universal Music Poland in December 2011.

On December 7, 2011, Szpak performed as a guest celebrity on the finale of the Top Model. Zostań modelką (Polish for Top Model. Become a Model) show, an ongoing Polish reality documentary based on Tyra Banks' America's Next Top Model.

In 2013, he was awarded first prize at the Russian song Festival in Zielona Gora for his performance of the famous Russian song titled "Dark Eyes" (Russian "Очи чёрные", Ochi chyornye).

2015: Byle być sobą

Byle być sobą (English: Only to be yourself) is the debut studio album by Szpak. It was released in Poland on 13 November 2015 through Sony Music Entertainment Poland. Titled as a reflection of his life and frame of mind at 24 years following the unexpected death of his mother, the album includes 12 songs performed in Polish as well as in English. The album, which was dedicated to the singer's mother has met with critical success in Poland. His flawless rendition of the song "Jesteś bohaterem" (English: "Real Hero") brought him first prize at the 2015 National Festival of Polish Song in Opole.

2016: Eurovision Song Contest

Michał Szpak represented Poland in the Eurovision Song Contest 2016 in Stockholm, Sweden with the song "Color of Your Life". The winner in the Polish national final was chosen by televoting; Polish TV viewers could give only one vote for each favorite singer from a single telephone number. He beat world-famous Polish performer Margaret, who came second, and another long time accomplished singer, Edyta Górniak, who was third. This was the first time Poland has held a competition to choose its entry since its return in 2014. The Eurovision pre-selection show took place on 5 March 2016 at the TVP Headquarters in Warsaw and was hosted by Artur Orzech. The Polish public chose Michał Szpak and his entry song titled "Color of Your Life", with Szpak winning overwhelmingly with 35.5% of the vote.

To promote his Eurovision Song Contest entry Szpak took part in the Eurovision Concert Tour in London (17 April 2016), Tel Aviv (12 April 2016), Amsterdam (9 April 2016) and later Portugal.

On 12 May, Szpak performed in the first half of the second Eurovision semi-final. Following his live semi-final performance of "Color of Your Life" he made it through to the grand final. On 14 May he performed 12th in the running order between the Eurovision contestants from France and Australia.

All in all, Szpak won 3rd place from the public televoting and ended up benefiting from the new voting system. Despite being in second to last place with the juries, he leapt from seven points to 229 when public votes were added, and finished eighth overall.

2017–present: Judge at The Voice of Poland and Dreamer
After finishing in 8th place in the Eurovision Song Contest 2016 in Stockholm, Michał Szpak has gone on to become a coach on The Voice of Poland replacing Natalia Kukulska. In 2017 he was the winning coach in his debut season with The Voice, promoting the winner, Marta Gałuszewska.

In 2018 he released his second studio album titled Dreamer. The songs from the album have achieved huge success on YouTube, each receiving well over a million views. In November 2018 he released his latest single, titled "Dreamer (Thanks to You My Friend)". The song is about being strong, moving on and chasing your dreams with the help of your friends and loved ones. His previous singles from the album, "King of the Season" and "Rainbow", have received 3.1m and 2.4m views on YouTube respectively.

Discography

Studio albums

Extended plays

Singles

As featured artist

Tours
 XI Tour (2012)
 Color Of Your Life Tour (2016–2017)
 Classica Tour (2018)

Awards and nominations
 2011: Polish Edition of The X Factor – second place
 2011: Poland Style & Design Awards for Creative Performance & Achievement Emerging Talent
 2013: Golden Samovar – Russian Song Festival 2013 in Zielona Góra
 2015: Super Premieres – 1st Prize at the 52. National Festival of Polish Song in Opole
 2016: Winner of the Polish national selection for the Eurovision Song Contest
 2016: Eighth place on the Eurovision Song Contest 2016 in Stockholm
 2016: Personality of The Year – grand gala "Plejady Gwiazd"
 2016: Superartist and Grand Prix Opole 2016 Award at the 53. National Festival of Polish Song in Opole

References

External links

 

1990 births
Living people
Polish pop singers
English-language singers from Poland
Eurovision Song Contest entrants of 2016
Eurovision Song Contest entrants for Poland
21st-century Polish male singers
21st-century Polish singers
SWPS University alumni
People from Jasło